Kidwelly railway station serves the town of Kidwelly, Carmarthenshire, Wales. The station is situated on the coast just southwest of Kidwelly itself.

The station was opened by the South Wales Railway on 11 October 1852 and was once the junction for a branch of the Burry Port and Gwendraeth Valley Railway which ran via Ty Coch to Trimsaran Road. This connection, which lay just to the east of the level crossing, was re-used between 1984 and 1996 for coal traffic to/from the washery at Coedbach following the closure of the flood-prone BP&GVR main line to Burry Port in 1983. Nothing remains today to show the industrial heritage of the railway here, as the branch has been dismantled.

History 

The station was first opened as a temporary wooden platform however on 26 March 1852 Emery of Gloucester was awarded the contract and a stone-built station was constructed of a style repeated all along the line. These station buildings have been demolished and replaced with basic shelters. The station is now unmanned and is a request stop.

On 20 June 1957 a Royal Air Force Hawker Hunter crashed 200 yards east of station with the death of the pilot.

At the east end of the station is a signal box with an adjacent level crossing where the road from Kidwelly to the old quay crosses the railway line.  The west end of the station ends with a bridge over the river. A World War II pillbox remains intact just before the bridge.

Services
There is a two-hourly service from the station for most of the day (Mon-Sat), improving to hourly during the morning and evening peak periods.  Stops are provided by both the West Wales/ to Manchester Piccadilly and Pembroke Dock to Swansea trains (peak periods and evenings only), though the daily Great Western Railway Carmarthen to London Paddington service also calls eastbound (except Saturdays). A similar service is provided on Sundays, but starting later in the day.

References

External links

Railway stations in Llanelli
DfT Category F1 stations
Former Great Western Railway stations
Railway stations in Great Britain opened in 1852
Railway stations served by Transport for Wales Rail
Railway request stops in Great Britain
1852 establishments in Wales
Railway Station